Chelsea Story is a 1951 British crime film directed by Charles Saunders and starring Henry Mollison, Sydney Tafler and Ingeborg von Kusserow.

Selected cast
 Henry Mollison - Mike Harvey
 Sydney Tafler - Fletcher Gilchrist
 Ingeborg von Kusserow - Janice
 Lesley Osmond - Louise
 Michael Moore - George
 Wallas Eaton - Danny
 Laurence Naismith - Sergeant Matthews
 Michael Ward - Chris Fawcett

References

External links
 

1951 films
Films directed by Charles Saunders
1951 crime films
British crime films
Films set in London
British black-and-white films
1950s English-language films
1950s British films